The 1879 Elginshire and Nairnshire by-election was fought on 17 September 1879.  The byelection was fought due to the succession to a peerage of the incumbent Liberal MP, Viscount Macduff.  It was won by the Liberal candidate Sir George Macpherson-Grant.

References

1879 in Scotland
1870s elections in Scotland
Elginshire
Politics of Moray
Politics of the county of Nairn
1879 elections in the United Kingdom
By-elections to the Parliament of the United Kingdom in Scottish constituencies